From the posterior wall of the saccule a canal, the endolymphatic duct, is given off; this duct is joined by the ductus utriculosaccularis, and then passes along the aquaeductus vestibuli and ends in a blind pouch (endolymphatic sac) on the posterior surface of the petrous portion of the temporal bone, where it is in contact with the dura mater.

Disorders of the endolymphatic duct include Meniere's Disease and Enlarged Vestibular Aqueduct.

Additional images

References

External links
  The Endolymphatic Duct and Sac

Vestibular system